Kudumba Thalaivan is a 1962 Indian Tamil-language drama film, directed by M. A. Thirumugam and produced by Sandow M. M. A. Chinnappa Thevar. The film stars M. G. Ramachandran, M. R. Radha and B. Saroja Devi. It was released on 15 August 1962. The film was a big hit at the box office and ran for over 100 days in theatres.

Plot 

Within a fantastically wealthy city family, Velayudam Pilai, the patriarch spends most of his time playing poker, so he releases all his responsibilities on his elder son, Somu, a relentless, serious, hard-working man, with extreme shyness. Whereas Vasu, the younger child is quite the opposite, an accomplished sportsman and one who moves in front with no obstacle in life.

When Velayudam Pilai welcomes young and beautiful Seeta in memory of his deceased father, the driver Ponnusamy, who saved his life from the claws of bad losers in poker, his two sons are going to fall each, without knowing it, lovers of the same girl of the good Samaritan. Seeta, on his side, suspecting nothing, admits her love for Vasu.

Cast 
 M. G. Ramachandran as Vasu
 M. R. Radha as Velayudam Pilai
 B. Saroja Devi as Seetha Ponnuswamy
 S. A. Ashokan as Somu
 V. K. Ramasamy as Chellappa
 Sandow M. M. A. Chinnappa Thevar as Rangan
 Gemini Balu as Rajappan
 M. V. Rajamma as Velamma
 Lakshmi Rajyam as Rani

Soundtrack 
The music was composed by K. V. Mahadevan, with lyrics by Kannadasan.

Reception 
The Indian Express praised the film for the performances of the cast.

References

External links 

1960s Tamil-language films
1962 films
Films directed by M. A. Thirumugam
Films scored by K. V. Mahadevan
Indian drama films